Thumatha monochroa is a moth in the family Erebidae first described by Vadim V. Zolotuhin in 1996. It is found in south-eastern Kazakhstan.

References

Nudariina
Moths described in 1996